Marie Rokkones Hansen (born 4 October 2000) is a Norwegian handball player who plays for Byåsen HE.

She also represented Norway in the 2019 Women's U-19 European Handball Championship, were she received bronze.

Achievements
European Women's U-19 Handball Championship:
Third place: 2019

References

2000 births
Living people
Norwegian female handball players
People from Trondheim